The King Stays King (also known as Formula, Vol. 1 Tour) is a worldwide concert tour by American singer Romeo Santos. The tour was a promotion for his debut solo album, Formula, Vol. 1. On December 13, 2011, Santos announced that he would begin his initial leg of his solo tour on February 11, 2012, in the United States and ended on July 20, 2013, in Lima, Peru.

Madison Square Garden
His first concert began with three consecutive shows at Madison Square Garden which all three became sold-out. During the concert at Madison Square Garden, Santos was accompanied by fellow bachata singer Prince Royce. For "Debate de 4",he had bachata musicians Luis Vargas and Antony Santos for one of the nights while the other nights had three men from the audience who were randomly selected to join Romeo Santos on the stage to sing the song. Raulín Rodríguez is also featured in the song but was not in any of the concerts. Usher made an appearance on the encore for the song "Promise" in which he is featured in. At the final concert in the Madison Square Garden, Santos was joined by American rapper P. Diddy for the song "Mi Corazoncito". The concerts at Madison Square Garden were recorded and later released as a live album and film titled The King Stays King: Sold Out at Madison Square Garden on November 6, 2012.

The US Tour
Following the concerts at Madison Square Garden, Santos continued his tour in Florida where he performed at the American Airlines Arena in Miami on March 1, 2012, and at the Amway Center in Orlando the following day. In the same month, he continued his US tour in Georgia,  Massachusetts, Virginia, Illinois, Texas, California, and Arizona, and ended on March 25 in Las Vegas, Nevada. He also announced that the tour would be extended to Latin American countries.

The World Tour
Santos began his world tour on May 31, 2012, in Venezuela where he performed in seven cities in the country: Caracas, Valencia, Barquisimeto, San Cristóbal, Mérida, Maracaibo, and Puerto La Cruz. Following his performances in Venezuela, Santos performed at the Movistar Arena in Santiago, Chile, on June 23, 2012, which drew 16,000 attendees. Santos continued to tour in South America where he performed two concerts in Ecuador, Peru, Paraguay where nearly 10,000 people attended the concert, and four concerts in Argentina. The concert at Luna Park in Buenos Aires, Argentina, drew 25,000 people completely filling the capacity at the concert.

In October 2012, Santos performed two concerts in Spain at Madrid and at Barcelona. After his performances in Spain, the tour continued on to Central America where he performed in Honduras, El Salvador, and Guatemala. On October 26, 2012, Santos performed in Cali, Colombia, which was originally supposed to be shared with Puerto Rican reggaeton singer Don Omar. However, Omar could not attend due to breaches with his contract with Al Eventos, the company responsible for managing the event.

On December 15 and 22, 2012 Santos performed at the Estadio Olímpico in Santo Domingo, Dominican Republic, where 50,000 people attended the concert.

Second Leg Of The Tour
The day before the concert in the Dominican Republic, Santos announced that he would start the second leg of the tour, which began on February 14, 2013, at the José Miguel Agrelot Coliseum in San Juan, Puerto Rico. He perform two nights in a row the Coliseum. Two weeks later, Santos performed at the Movistar Arena in Chile. The second tour leg continued throughout the United States from March 22, 2013, in Newark, New Jersey, until April 26, 2013, in Hollywood, California. His last concerts of the tour in Latin America included shows six in cities in Mexico, one show in Panama and one in Lima, Peru which would officially end the tour on July 20, 2013.

Tour dates

References
Footnotes

2012 concert tours
2013 concert tours